The 2018–19 Boston College Eagles men's basketball team represented Boston College during the 2018–19 NCAA Division I men's basketball season. The Eagles, led by fifth-year head coach Jim Christian, played their home games at the Conte Forum as members of the Atlantic Coast Conference.

Previous season
The Eagles finished the 2017–18 season finished the season 19–16, 7–11 in ACC play to finish in 12th place. In the ACC tournament, they defeated Georgia Tech and NC State before losing in the quarterfinals to Clemson. They received an invitation to the National Invitation Tournament where they lost in the first round to Western Kentucky.

Offseason

Departures

Incoming transfers

Under NCAA transfer rules, Jared Hamilton has to sit out until December and will be eligible to start in December during the 2018–19 season. Jared Hamilton has one and a half years of remaining eligibility.

Recruiting class of 2018

Roster

Schedule and results

|-
!colspan=9 style=| Exhibition

|-
!colspan=9 style=| Non-conference regular season

|-
!colspan=9 style=| ACC Regular Season

|-
!colspan=9 style=|ACC tournament

Source.

See also
 2018–19 Boston College Eagles women's basketball team

References

Boston College Eagles men's basketball seasons
Boston College
Boston College Eagles men's basketball
Boston College Eagles men's basketball
Boston College Eagles men's basketball
Boston College Eagles men's basketball